Papilio euterpinus is a species of Neotropical swallowtail butterfly from the genus Papilio that is found in Colombia, Ecuador and Peru.

Taxonomy
Papilio euterpinus is a member of the homerus species-group. The members of this clade are
Papilio cacicus Lucas, 1852
Papilio euterpinus Salvin & Godman, 1868
Papilio garamas (Geyer, [1829])
Papilio homerus Fabricius, 1793
Papilio menatius (Hübner, [1819])
Papilio warscewiczii Hopffer, 1865

Papilio euterpinus is in the subgenus Pterourus Scopoli, 1777 which also includes the species-groups:- troilus species-group, glaucus species-group, the zagreus species-group and the scamander species-group.

References

Lewis, H. L., 1974 Butterflies of the World  Page 24, figure 22

External links
Butterflies of America types 
Butterfly corner Images from Naturhistorisches Museum Wien

euterpinus
Butterflies described in 1868
Papilionidae of South America
Taxa named by Osbert Salvin
Taxa named by Frederick DuCane Godman